Columbus Tower may refer to:

 Columbus Tower (London), United Kingdom
 Columbus Tower (San Francisco), California

Buildings and structures disambiguation pages